Cossé-le-Vivien is a commune in the Mayenne department in north-western France.

Geography
The river Oudon flows through the middle of the commune and forms most of its north-western border.  It contains a museum dedicated to Robert Tatin's work.

See also
Communes of the Mayenne department

References

Cosselevivien